The Vermont Catamounts represent the University of Vermont in Women's Hockey East Association play during the 2017–18 NCAA Division I women's ice hockey season.

Offseason
April 5: Amanda Pelkey ('15) has been chosen to Team USA for 2017-18, in preparation for the 2018 Olympics in Korea.

Recruiting

Standings

Roster

2017–18 Catamounts

Schedule

|-
!colspan=12 style=""| Regular Season

|-
!colspan=12 style=""| WHEA Tournament

Awards and honors

References

Vermont
Vermont Catamounts women's ice hockey seasons
Cata
Cata